Vaho or baho is a mix of meat, green plantains and yuca cooked in banana leaves. It is a traditional Nicaraguan dish originated from the mix of cultures between the indigenous, mestizos and Afro-Nicaraguans of the country.

In Nicaraguan Spanish and some other dialects, the name is pronounced as vajo or bajo. There is some controversy as to whether the correct spelling is vaho, baho, vajo or bajo.

Vaho is served with ensalada de repollo, a cabbage and tomato salad made with vinegar and lemon/lime juice. The salad tops the meat, yuca and plantains. The meat used to make this dish is typically beef brisket. For some families, it is a traditional Sunday dish.  It is also served in many restaurants.

Nicaraguan cuisine
Plantain dishes
Steamed foods